Daniel R. Dominguez (born June 2, 1945) is a senior United States district judge of the United States District Court for the District of Puerto Rico.

Education and career

Born in San Juan, Puerto Rico, Dominguez received a Bachelor of Arts degree from Boston University in 1967 and a Bachelor of Laws from the University of Puerto Rico Law School in 1970. He was in the United States Army Reserve in 1967. He was in private practice in Hato Rey, Puerto Rico from 1970 to 1994.

Federal judicial service

On June 21, 1994, Dominguez was nominated by President Bill Clinton to a seat on the United States District Court for the District of Puerto Rico vacated by Gilberto Gierbolini-Ortiz. Dominguez was confirmed by the United States Senate on September 28, 1994, and received his commission on September 29, 1994. He assumed senior status on July 31, 2011.

See also
List of Hispanic/Latino American jurists

References
  

1945 births
Living people
Boston University alumni
University of Puerto Rico alumni
Hispanic and Latino American judges
Judges of the United States District Court for the District of Puerto Rico
United States district court judges appointed by Bill Clinton
United States Army soldiers
People from San Juan, Puerto Rico
20th-century American judges
United States Army reservists
21st-century American judges